"La voce del silenzio" is a 1968 song composed by  (music), Paolo Limiti and Mogol (lyrics). The song premiered at the 18th edition of the Sanremo Music Festival with a double performance of Tony Del Monaco and Dionne Warwick, placing at the 14th place with 28 points achieved (that is, last of the finalists).

Cover and adaptement 
The song was later covered by numerous artists including Mina, Mia Martini, Aphrodite's Child, The Supremes, and others.

Adaptement in English

Track listings

Tony Del Monaco version 
7" single - CGD N 9675
 "La voce del silenzio" (Elio Isola, Paolo Limiti, Mogol)
 "Una piccola candela" (Enrico Polito, Tony Del Monaco, Giancarlo Guardabassi)

Dionne Warwick version 
7" single - Scepter SC 717
 "La voce del silenzio" (Elio Isola, Paolo Limiti, Mogol)
 "Unchained Melody" (Alex North, Hy Zaret)

References 

1968 singles
1968 songs
Pop songs
Italian songs
Italian-language songs
Number-one singles in Italy
Compagnia Generale del Disco singles
Scepter Records singles
Sanremo Music Festival songs
Songs written by Mogol (lyricist)
Dionne Warwick songs
Mina (Italian singer) songs
Aphrodite's Child songs
Dolcenera songs
Massimo Ranieri songs
Ornella Vanoni songs
Mia Martini songs
Andrea Bocelli songs